Pascal D'Angelis “Dean” Warner (August 12, 1822August 28, 1910) was a Michigan politician.

Early life 
Warner was born in Hector, Schuyler County, New York on August 12, 1822 to parents Seth Andrew LeMoyne and Sally Warner.

Personal life 
Warner was married to Rhoda Elizabeth Botsford. Together, they were the parent of at least one child, and were the adoptive parents of Fred M. Warner.

Political career 
Warner served as a member of the Michigan House of Representatives the Oakland County district, before the districts of Michigan were divided, from 1851 to 1852. Then, Warner served as member of the Michigan House of Representatives from the Oakland County 5th district 1865 to 1866. Warner, in 1867, was delegate to Michigan state constitutional convention. Warner then served as the Speaker of the Michigan House of Representatives when he served as a member of the Michigan House of Representatives from the Oakland County 3rd district 1867 to 1868. Warner first served on the Michigan Senate from 1869 to 1870, when he retired from politics.

Death 
Warner died on August 28, 1910 in Farmington, Oakland County, Michigan. Warner is interred at Oakwood Cemetery.

References 

1822 births
1910 deaths
Speakers of the Michigan House of Representatives
Republican Party members of the Michigan House of Representatives
Republican Party Michigan state senators
Burials in Michigan
19th-century American politicians